HNLMS Van Galen was a  of the Royal Netherlands Navy, named after the 17th century Dutch Commodore Johan van Galen. She served during World War II. The opening chapter of E.H.Larive's autobiography 'The Man Who Came In From Colditz' (p. Hale, 1975) describes in detail the craft's demise.

Service history
The ship was laid down on 28 May 1927, at the shipyard Fijenoord, in Rotterdam, and launched on 28 June 1928. The ship was commissioned on 22 October 1929.

On 22 February 1932, Van Galen left Surabaya, for a trip to Shanghai, to look after Dutch interests in the region. She returned in April that year.

On 16 November 1935, Van Galen, her sister , and the cruiser , made a visit to Saigon.

On 16 August 1937, the ship was again send to Shanghai, because of rising political tension in China. With the ship, 150 marines were sent to protect European citizens and interests.

On 8 May 1940, she returned to the Netherlands, on 10 May, war with Germany broke out. The Germans had captured the airfield Waalhaven, in Rotterdam, and Van Galen was ordered to bombard the airfield. A German aircraft attacked her while underway and she sank near Merwehaven. The Germans decided to raise the ship on 23 October 1941. The wreck was scrapped in Hendrik-Ido-Ambacht.

References

Admiralen-class destroyers
Ships built in Schiedam
1928 ships
World War II destroyers of the Netherlands
Naval ships of the Netherlands captured by Germany during World War II
Ships sunk by German aircraft
Destroyers sunk by aircraft